Grazilda is a Philippine television drama fantasy romance series broadcast by GMA Network. The series is a loose adaptation on Drizella, the stepsister of Cinderella. Directed by Dominic Zapata, it stars Glaiza de Castro in the title role. It premiered on September 13, 2010 on the network's Telebabad line up. The series concluded on January 7, 2011 with a total of 85 episodes. It was replaced by Dwarfina in its timeslot.

The series is streaming online on YouTube.

Cast and characters

Lead cast
Glaiza de Castro as Grazilda

Supporting cast
Geoff Eigenmann as Eric
Yasmien Kurdi as Cindy
Daniel Matsunaga as Kasmir 
Jolina Magdangal as a fairy godmother
Sheryl Cruz as Fabiola
Cherie Gil as Veronne
Rio Locsin as Matilda
Joel Torre as Fernando
Dominic Roco as Vicente
Polo Ravales as Matthew
Caridad Sanchez as Tisay
Angeli Nicole Sanoy as Jik Jik

Guest cast
Gwen Zamora as Cinderella
Benedict Campos as Prince Charming
Stef Prescott as Tonette
Bodie Cruz as Ben
Ernie Zarate as Leon
Jobelle Salvador as Stella
Gene Padilla as Elias
Sherilyn Reyes as Weng
Sarah Lahbati as Esmeralda
Dang Cruz as Celia
Sunshine Garcia as Precious
Djanin Cruz as Anatalia

Ratings
According to AGB Nielsen Philippines' Mega Manila People/Individual television ratings, the pilot episode of Grazilda earned a 14.5% rating.

References

External links
 
 

2010 Philippine television series debuts
2011 Philippine television series endings
Fantaserye and telefantasya
Filipino-language television shows
GMA Network drama series
Philippine romance television series
Television shows based on fairy tales
Works based on Cinderella